Ospedale Niguarda Ca' Granda, best known simply as Ospedale Niguarda or Niguarda Hospital is largest and one of the  most important hospitals in Milan, Italy.

Niguarda Hospital was ranked on 47th in Newsweek's World's Best Hospitals 2020, and was ranked on 1st in Italy. And this hospital was ranked on 60th in the World's Best Hospitals 2023, and was ranked on 2nd in Italy.

History 
The hospital was opened on October 3, 1939.

See also 
 Ospedale degli Innocenti
 Johns Hopkins Hospital
 University of Milan
 International Medical School, University of Milan

References

External links
 Niguarda official site
 Niguarda official English site

Hospitals in Milan